The Maker of Moons is an 1896 short story collection by Robert W. Chambers which followed the publication of Chambers' most famous work, The King in Yellow (1895).
 
It contained eight new stories, including the title story, one of his weird tales, and several romantic Art Nouveau stories, concluding with two less distinguished weird tales. The latter were subsequently incorporated into the episodic novel In Search of the Unknown.

The first three stories are linked by the theme of a dream wife named Ysonde, and they form a triptych. The weird nature of the first has interesting echoes in the other two, which feature picturesque animal figures, such as a Red Ibis and a disagreeable porcupine.

The story "In The Name of the Most High" is a war story set in the American Civil War. The next two stories are humorous romantic tales with a fishing theme and setting. Chambers' love of natural scenery illuminates most of the stories. The quality throughout is rather fine.

Published by Putnam's, New York and London, in 1896.

The first edition featured a frontispiece with a black and white illustration by Lancelot Speed.

Contents
 "The Maker of Moons"
 "The Silent Land"
 "The Black Water"
 "In the Name of the Most High"
 "Boy's Sister"
 "The Crime"
 "A Pleasant Evening"
 "The Man At The Next Table"

Reprints
In 1974, Fantasy House published the story "The Maker of Moons" along with "The Demoiselle d'Ys" (from The King in Yellow) in volume 4 of their "Fantasy Reader" series, under the title The Maker of Moons.

In 1954, Shroud, Publishers, reprinted "The Maker of Moons" with a modified ending that omitted the last two paragraphs which linked his story to the later ones in the set, as explained by K J Krueger in the "Postscript".

External links
 Australian Gutenberg Text
 

1896 short story collections
American short story collections
Cthulhu Mythos anthologies
Horror short story collections